Dr. Gourmohan Roy College, established in 1986, is the general degree college in 
Monteswar, Purba Bardhaman district,West Bengal, India. It offers undergraduate (UG) courses in arts and commerce. It is affiliated to  University of Burdwan.

Departments

Arts and Commerce
Bengali
English
Sanskrit
History
Geography
Political science
Philosophy
Commerce
Education

Accreditation
In 2016 the college has been awarded B grade by the National Assessment and Accreditation Council (NAAC). The college is recognized by the University Grants Commission (UGC).

See also
List of institutions of higher education in West Bengal
Education in India
Education in West Bengal

References

External links
Official Website
University of Burdwan

Colleges affiliated to University of Burdwan
Educational institutions established in 1986
Universities and colleges in Purba Bardhaman district
1986 establishments in West Bengal